Gulella io is a species of very small air-breathing land snail, a terrestrial pulmonate gastropod mollusk in the family Streptaxidae.

Distribution 
The non-indigenous distribution of this species includes:
 The Czech Republic as a "hothouse alien"

References

Gulella
Gastropods described in 1974